The National Anthem of the Islamic Republic of Iran is the national anthem of Iran. It was adopted in 1990, replacing the previous anthem used during the rule of Ruhollah Khomeini. It was composed by Hassan Riyahi, and the lyrics were written by Sayed Bagheri. It is the fourth official Iranian national anthem.
یه دیالوگ خیلی خوب تو فیلمHyouka بود که میگفت : تو اسممو میدونی نه داستانمو  تو لبخندمو میبینی نه دردادمو  تو متوجه چیزایی که رها میکنم میشی، نه زخمام  میتونی حرفامو بخونی ، نه ذهنمو  پس راجبم نه نظر بده و نه قضاوتم کن چون تو فقط قسمتی از من رو میبینی که خودم خواستم نشونت بدم ️

History

Due to the death of Supreme Leader Ruhollah Khomeini in 1989, Iran adopted its current anthem after a competition the following year. At the time of its adoption, it was the second-shortest anthem in the world, after Japan's anthem, "Kimigayo", with seven lines.

Lyrics

Persian lyrics

English translation

See also

Royal Salute (anthem)
Salute of the Sublime State of Persia
Imperial Anthem of Iran
"Ey Iran"
"Payandeh Bada Iran"

Notes

References

External links

Instrumental version of "Sorud-e Melli-e Iran" in RealAudio

Iran
Iranian patriotic songs
1990 establishments in Iran
National anthem compositions in G major
1989 songs